Deh Now-ye Hashemabad (also Romanized as Deh Now-ye Hāshemābād; also known as Hāshemābād and Deh Now-ye Hāshem) is a village in Ordughesh Rural District, Zeberkhan District, Nishapur County, Razavi Khorasan Province, Iran. At the 2006 census, its population was 170, in 42 families.

References 

Populated places in Nishapur County